The Central Library of Aberdeen in Scotland is located on Rosemount Viaduct and is the main library for the city.

History

The library is housed in a category C(S) listed building. It cost £10,000 to build and was publicly funded through local campaigning that began in 1889. It was opened 5 July 1892 by Andrew Carnegie after he and his wife contributed £2000 to the construction process.  It is one of a group of three civic buildings - the other two being St Mark's Church & His Majesty's Theatre - known as "Education, Salvation and Damnation."

Collection

The library contains large collections of local maps, over 15,000 photographs, birth and death records and a collection of local newspapers. Much of the library's stock is held on microfilm.

References

External links
Aberdeen City Council Libraries
Andrew Carnegie Libraries 

Library buildings completed in 1892
Culture in Aberdeen
Carnegie libraries in Scotland
Tourist attractions in Aberdeen
Category C listed buildings in Aberdeen
Public libraries in Scotland
1889 establishments in Scotland